Castilleja pruinosa is a species of Indian paintbrush known by the common name frosted Indian paintbrush. It is native to California and Oregon, where it grows in several types of forested habitat.

Description
Castilleja pruinosa is a perennial herb, sometimes becoming bushy, growing up to about 80 centimeters in maximum height. It is densely hairy, becoming gray-green in color. The leaves are lance-shaped and sometimes lobed, measuring up to 8 centimeters long. The inflorescence is a cluster of bright red or orange-red bracts. Flowers emerge between the bracts, each up to 2 or 3 centimeters long and greenish in color with reddish margins.

San Gabriel Mountains
The rare species Castilleja gleasonii, which is endemic to the San Gabriel Mountains of California, is sometimes included in C. pruinosa.

References

External links

Jepson Manual Treatment: Castilleja pruinosa
Castilleja pruinosa Photo gallery

pruinosa
Flora of California
Flora of Oregon
Plants described in 1898
Flora without expected TNC conservation status